Deas is a Scottish surname. People with this surname include:

 Bob Deas, (1886-1960), Australian rules footballer
 Sir David Deas (1807–1876), medical officer in the Royal Navy
 Charles Deas (1818–1867), American painter
 Sir George Deas (1804–1887), Scottish judge
 Jack Deas (1875-1949), Australian rules footballer
 James Deas (politician) (1890–1963), New Zealand politician
 Justin Deas (born 1948), American actor
 Laura Deas (born 1988), Welsh athlete 
 Lionel Deas (1872–1913), English cricketer
 Lynn Deas (1952-2020), American professional bridge player
 Paul Deas (born 1972), retired Scottish professional footballer
 Sir Edward Deas Thomson (1800–1879), Australian politician
 Zachariah C. Deas (1819–1882), brigadier general in the Confederate States Army during the American Civil War

See also
Deas (disambiguation)

de:Deas